Apsley Pellatt (1763 – 21 January 1826) was an English glass manufacturer.

Apsley Pellatt was the son of Apsley Pellatt (1736–1798), of Lewes, Sussex, and of St Margaret's, Westminster, and Sarah, daughter of Thomas Meriton, of Bermondsey, Surrey. At St Andrews church, Holborn, London on 20 March 1788 he married Mary Maberly (1768–1822), daughter of prosperous manufacturer Stephen Maberly and sister of John Maberly. They had 15 children, of which Apsley Pellatt was the eldest son. Pellatt lived at The Friars, Lewes, and ran his business at St Paul's Churchyard, London.

Sometime around 1790 he bought the Falcon Glass House in Blackfriars, London which had been making glass since 1693. In 1807  he took out a patent for the manufacture of lights (round lens-shaped windows like portholes) to allow natural light to illuminate the interiors of dark rooms, especially the holds of ships.

His eldest son Apsley joined the business in 1811 and took it over completely on Apsley Snr's death in 1826, renaming it Apsley Pellatt & Co. A younger son, Frederic, also joined the company in due course. Apsley Snr was buried with his wife in the Cribbe family vault in Bunhill Fields, London.

Pellatt's third son, Mill Pellatt (1795–1863), was grandfather of the Canadian financier Sir Henry Pellatt.

References

External links
 Visit to Apsley Pellatt's glass works 
 Glassmaking Companies

1763 births
1826 deaths
Burials at Bunhill Fields
Glass makers